H.P. Broeker House is a historic home located at Washington, Franklin County, Missouri. It was built about 1868, and is a two-story, five bay, brick dwelling on a brick foundation.  It has a flat roof, one story shed-roofed rear ell, and low segmental arched door and window openings.

It was listed on the National Register of Historic Places in 2000.

References

Houses on the National Register of Historic Places in Missouri
Houses completed in 1868
Buildings and structures in Franklin County, Missouri
National Register of Historic Places in Franklin County, Missouri